Walmore Common ( & ) is a  nature reserve  on the flood-plain of the River Severn, west of the city of Gloucester in England and north of the village of Chaxhill.  It was notified as a biological Site of Special Scientific Interest in 1966. The site is listed in the 'Forest of Dean Local Plan Review' as a Key Wildlife Site (KWS).

The common is recognised as a wetland area of international importance and is designated as a Ramsar site. The common is recognised as a Special Protection Area (SPA) under the EC Directive on the conservation of Wild Birds.

Location and habitat
The site is in the Severn Vale and is subject to annual winter flooding. It is low-lying and comprises two sections.  It overlies the only cited significant area of peat in Gloucestershire. It is a wetland site of local botanical and ornithological importance. The habitats are unimproved and improved neutral grassland, marshy grassland
and open water ditches/rhynes.

Flora
The eastern part of the designated area is dominated by wavy hair grass, marsh foxtail and creeping bent. The improved grassland is dominated by perennial rye grass, creeping bent and Timothy. The northern section is mostly marshy and comprises rush and sedge species. The marshes also support bog pimpernel and ragged robin.  The ditches are significant as they are examples of a disappearing habitat.  A wide range of wetland plants flourish with a large population of flote grass and several pondweeds.  There are rarities including tubular water dropwort (Oenanthe fistulosa).

Winter feeding
Its significance is as a winter feeding and roosting area for wildfowl.  This includes Bewick's swans, wigeon, gadwall and shoveller.

References

SSSI Source
 Natural England SSSI information on the citation
 Natural England SSSI information on the Walmore Common units

External links
 Natural England (SSSI information)
Site description from the UK SPA Network

 Directory entry for www.wetlands.org

Special Protection Areas in England
Sites of Special Scientific Interest in Gloucestershire
Ramsar sites in England